European route E 842 is a European B class road in Italy, connecting the cities Naples – Canosa di Puglia.

Route 
 
 E45 Naples
 E841 Avellino
 E55 Canosa di Puglia

External links 
 UN Economic Commission for Europe: Overall Map of E-road Network (2007)
 International E-road network

International E-road network
Roads in Italy